Kyros Marinis (born 1928) is a Greek former athlete. He competed in the men's long jump at the 1948 Summer Olympics.

References

External links
 

1928 births
Possibly living people
Athletes (track and field) at the 1948 Summer Olympics
Greek male long jumpers
Olympic athletes of Greece
Sportspeople from Alexandria
20th-century Greek people